Vorstius or Vorst is a Dutch and German surname. Notable people with the surname include:
Aelius Everhardus Vorstius (1565-1624) Dutch physician, botanist and professor at Leiden University
Conrad Vorstius (1569–1622) German-Dutch heterodox Remonstrant theologian, and professor of theology at Leiden University.
Adolph Vorstius (1597–1663) Dutch physician and botanist, son of Aelius Everhardus

German-language surnames